Richard James Codey (born November 27, 1946) is an American Democratic Party politician who served as the 53rd governor of New Jersey from 2004 to 2006. He has served in the New Jersey Senate since 1982 and served as the President of the Senate from 2002 to 2010. He represents the 27th Legislative District, which covers the western portions of Essex County and the southeastern portion of Morris County. Codey is the longest-serving state legislator in New Jersey history, having served in the New Jersey Legislature continuously since January 8, 1974. He has served as the Deputy Senate President Pro Tem since 2022.

Early life

Codey grew up in his family's funeral home in Orange. He attended Our Lady of the Valley High School and transferred to Orange High School, neither of them successfully, before switching to Oratory Preparatory School in Summit, from which he graduated. He went on to take over his father's job as a licensed funeral director.  When his father, Donald, became the county coroner, Richard was drafted to help with death scene pickups. Codey remembered, "I was 14, taking bodies out of train wrecks. You grow up quick." Codey has described himself as "100% Irish".

New Jersey Assembly 
Codey left the funeral trade to try his hand in politics in 1973 when he was first elected to the State Assembly, with Eldridge Hawkins as his running mate. He served in the Assembly from 1974 to 1982. In 1981 he earned a bachelor's degree in education from Fairleigh Dickinson University.

New Jersey Senate 
Codey was elected to the State Senate that same year and has since risen through the ranks to become Senate President. He first ascended to that post in 2002 to 2010. He serves in the Senate on the Legislative Services Commission. He also has a hockey arena named in his honor, also known as South Mountain Arena in West Orange, New Jersey.

Return to Senate service 
 Instead of running for a full term as governor, Codey was re-elected to the New Jersey Senate in 2007. Codey represents the 27th Legislative District together with Assemblyman John F. McKeon, who was coincidentally also the mayor of West Orange, a town in Essex County, New Jersey, where Senator Codey's family was raised. Codey and his family lived in West Orange until 2009, when they moved to neighboring Roseland. The other Assembly seat is occupied by Mila Jasey, who was elected to fill the seat in November 2007 after the resignation of Mims Hackett on September 8, 2007.

In September, 2006, during Menendez's re-election campaign for his U.S. Senate seat, it was revealed that Menendez was the subject of an ongoing federal criminal investigation. The situation closely resembled the situation faced by Robert Torricelli in his 2002 re-election campaign, where ethical problems and declining poll numbers led to Torricelli exiting the race, to be replaced as the Democratic candidate by former senator Frank Lautenberg. Political observers speculated that Codey could be tapped to fill the candidate's slot should Menendez decide to withdraw from the race. However, on November 7, 2006, Menendez was elected to a full term.

Codey briefly resigned as President of the Senate for one day in January 2008 in order to let retiring Sen. Bernard Kenny of Hoboken serve as Senate President on his last day in office. Senator Kenny had served as Senate Majority Leader under Codey. Kenny served as Senate President from January 7 to January 8, when Senator Codey was reelected to the Senate Presidency for the next legislative session.

In December 2016, Codey was one of several Catholic legislators who supported legislation legalizing assisted suicide.

Committee assignments 
Committee assignments for the current session are:
Legislative Oversight, as Chair
Environment and Energy
Health, Human Services and Senior Citizens

District 27 
Each of the 40 districts in the New Jersey Legislature has one representative in the New Jersey Senate and two members in the New Jersey General Assembly. The representatives from the 27th District for the 2022—23 Legislative Session are:
Senator Richard Codey (D) 
Assemblyman John F. McKeon (D) 
Assemblywoman Mila Jasey (D)

Governor of New Jersey

2002 
Following Governor Christine Todd Whitman's resignation in 2001 to become head of the EPA, Codey was one of three different senate presidents (along with Donald DiFrancesco and John O. Bennett, as well as Attorney General John Farmer) to serve as acting governor within the one-year period between Whitman's resignation and Jim McGreevey's inauguration in January 2002. DiFrancesco served as acting governor for all but the last week of this period, until his term as senate president ended. As attorney general, Farmer then served as acting governor for ninety minutes, until the election of Bennett and Codey as co-presidents of the senate. The latter two then divided the last week of the term between them, with Codey serving for three days, from January 12, 2002, to January 15, 2002, leading to a situation in which the state had five different people serving as governor during a period of eight days (DiFrancesco, Farmer, Bennett, Codey, and McGreevey).

2004 to 2006 
Codey became acting governor again with the resignation of Jim McGreevey on November 15, 2004. According to the New Jersey State Constitution at the time, in the event of a vacancy in the governor's office, the President of the State Senate takes on the additional position of acting governor until the next gubernatorial election. After taking over in 2004 Codey became popular with many New Jersey residents and reportedly considered a run for a full four-year term. However, U.S. Senator Jon Corzine's large number of endorsements as well as his large campaign war chest, funded primarily by his great personal wealth, convinced Codey to announce officially on January 31, 2005, that he would step aside. Codey served as governor until Corzine was sworn in on January 17, 2006, following Corzine's victory in the November 8, 2005 elections. Some had speculated that Codey could be a possible candidate for Corzine's vacant seat in the United States Senate, with Corzine appointing his own successor once he was sworn in as governor. However, Codey announced on November 23, 2005, that he was not interested in the Senate seat.

With the passage on November 8, 2005, of a constitutional amendment creating the position of lieutenant governor to take effect with the 2009 election, Codey became the last person to serve simultaneously as governor and senate president.
 
On January 9, 2006, Codey became governor (no longer acting governor) as a result of his signing legislation that provided that a person who serves as acting governor for a continuous period of at least 180 days will be "Governor of the State of New Jersey" for official and historical purposes.  This law was made retroactive to 2001, covering both Codey's service after McGreevey's resignation and the service of Donald DiFrancesco following the resignation of Governor Christine Todd Whitman in 2001.  This made DiFrancesco New Jersey's 51st governor and Codey the 53rd.

Codey is an advocate of mental health awareness and strongly favors including mental health funding in employee medical benefit packages and Medicare. Both Codey and his wife, Mary Jo, have spoken candidly about her past struggles with postpartum depression. In early 2005, Codey responded in person to New Jersey 101.5 talk radio host Craig Carton, who jokingly criticized Mary Jo and her mental health on the air. Some argue that Codey's comments were a physical threat against the radio personality. The Governor himself admits to telling Carton during the altercation that he wished he could "take [Carton] outside", while in the presence of the six New Jersey State Policemen who were serving as his personal bodyguards. There was some speculation that this incident helped Codey decide not to run for a full term as governor. In July 2005, Codey also defended actress Brooke Shields after she faced criticism for discussing her postpartum depression. In December 2005, Codey appeared on Carton's radio program to help put the incident behind both of them.

Codey appointed Mary Jane Cooper to be New Jersey's first-ever Inspector General, a position created to root out waste and mismanagement in government. Codey added $7 million in new funding to agencies devoted to public accountability, per the recommendations that resulted from an audit of state ethics codes that he commissioned. In March 2005, Codey cracked down on pay to play when he signed a law banning campaign contributions by businesses holding state contracts in several circumstances.

As governor, Codey championed a bill to ban smoking from indoor spaces in the state, more money for stem cell research, increased funding for mental health, and sports.  Codey created a task force to recommend ways to end steroid abuse in high school and college sports in the state. The task force established drug testing for high school athletes on teams that play in the championships, with the state paying for the drug testing program. He also successfully negotiated for MetLife Stadium, which was constructed jointly by the New York Giants and New York Jets.

In December 2005, Codey announced he was not accepting a new state slogan recommended by the State Commerce Department, following a study by a marketing consultant, which was paid for by the state.  He said he felt the slogan "We'll win you over" made the state seem desperate. Governor Codey openly solicited slogan suggestions from citizens and then choose five finalists, which he opened to a vote from the public. Days prior to leaving the governor's office, Codey announced the winner: "New Jersey: Come See for Yourself".

Shortly before leaving office, Codey signed the first legislative moratorium on capital punishment enacted by any state in the nation. The moratorium ended with the permanent ban of capital punishment by Codey's successor, Jon Corzine.

As Corzine attended the swearing in of Bob Menendez as a U.S. Senator on January 18, 2006, in Washington, D.C., Codey spent part of his first day as former governor as the acting governor of the state.

Cabinet 
 Virginia Bauer, Secretary of Commerce, Economic Growth and Tourism
 George Hayman, Acting Commissioner of Corrections (as of January 3, 2006)
 Donald Bryan, Acting Commissioner of Banking and Insurance
 Peter Cammarano, Chief of staff to the governor
 Bradley Campbell, Commissioner of Environmental Protection
 Thomas Carver, Commissioner of Labor and Workforce Development (until October 2005)
 James Davy, Commissioner of Human Services
 Lucille Davy, Acting Commissioner of Education (from September 2005)
 Paul Fader, Chief Counsel to the governor
 Jeanne Fox, President of the Board of Public Utilities
 Col. Joseph Fuentes, Superintendent of the State Police
 Peter C. Harvey, State Attorney General
 Dr. Fred Jacobs, Commissioner of Health and Senior Services
 Charles Kuperus, Secretary of Agriculture
 John Lettiere, Commissioner of Transportation
 Susan Bass Levin, Commissioner of Community Affairs (until June 2005)
 William Librera, Commissioner of Education (until September 2005)
 John McCormac, State Treasurer
 Charles Richman, Acting Commissioner of Community Affairs (from June 2005)
 Major Gen. Glenn K. Rieth, Adjutant General
 A.J. Sabath, Commissioner of Labor and Workforce Development (from October 2005)
 Seema Singh, Ratepayer Advocate
 Regena Thomas, Secretary of State of New Jersey
 Rolando Torres, Commissioner of Personnel

2007 
On April 12, 2007, Codey became Acting Governor of New Jersey when Corzine was incapacitated due to serious injuries suffered in a car accident that day. Codey became acting governor since New Jersey did not have the position of lieutenant governor until after the 2009 election. Corzine resumed his duties as governor on May 7, 2007.

Public opinion summary 
Former Governor Jim McGreevey was the 11th governor in the history of the United States to resign due to a political scandal. In August 2004, just after McGreevey announced his intention to leave the office that November, Fairleigh Dickinson University's PublicMind measured public views of his soon-to-be successor, Richard Codey, president of the New Jersey Senate.  In a study released on August 16, 2004, FDU reported that 68% of New Jersey voters did not recognize Richard Codey's name. Nevertheless, 30% of voters shared a favorable view of him while only 9% reported an unfavorable view.

Even two months later, in early October 2004, FDU's poll release entitled "Richard Who?" found that, despite that Codey would soon take over as governor from McGreevey, the name Richard Codey remained unknown to 59% of New Jersey voters. However, voters who knew him held distinctly more favorable than unfavorable views by a two to one ratio,  (23%–10%).

By early January 2005, when PublicMind again conducted a statewide study in which voters were asked: "Have you heard of Richard Codey?," the numbers showed that 35% of New Jersey voters still did not recognize Codey's name. However, 48% had a favorable view of him compared to 7% of those who had an unfavorable view,  "a formidable 7:1 ratio" said the press release.

According to the next FDU PublicMind poll released on April 13, 2005, Gov. Codey's recognition had improved significantly since the previous August when former Gov. McGreevey announced his resignation. Five months after assuming office, four of five voters (78%) recognized his name, (a 46-point increase from August 2004). In addition, voters were twice as likely to have a favorable view (51%) as opposed to an unfavorable view (25%) of the governor, a two-to-one ratio despite that three in five (59%) also lamented the state was "on the wrong track."

In a study conducted by FDU's PublicMind on July 21, 2005, results showed that 51% of NJ voters believed the state was on the wrong track. Nevertheless, their concerns about the state's problems did not impact the image of Gov. Codey. Numbers indicated that half of voters in New Jersey rated Codey's performance as excellent or good. Only 8% reported that he was doing a poor job. Dr. Peter J. Woolley, professor of political science and executive director of PublicMind commented: "That's pretty good for New Jersey… Codey's plain spoken approach seems to soften people's views of the state's problems."

According to a PublicMind poll released September 27, 2005, a total of 21% of New Jersey voters still did not recognize their incumbent governor Richard Codey. However, this was a remarkable increase in recognition from six months earlier, when 35% of voters failed to recognize his name. In addition, more than half of voters (57%) agreed that his performance could be considered "good" or "excellent."

A few months later, a sizable majority of New Jersey voters still retained a favorable view of the new governor. A PublicMind study released on November 22, 2005, indicated that 65% of voters shared a favorable view of Gov. Codey compared to 11% who held an unfavorable view.

As Gov. Codey prepared to leave office, making way for newly elected governor Jon Corzine, a FDU PublicMind study released on January 12, 2006, showed that 48% of voters said the state was "on the wrong track" while 34% said it was headed in the right direction. However, though voters had a negative view of the direction of state, their view of Gov. Codey was strongly positive. In that same study, 68% of voters who recognized Gov. Codey had a favorable opinion of him and the pollsters noted that the outgoing governor had "an impressive 5:1 ratio of favorable to unfavorable opinion".

Out of the governor's office for over five years, Codey continued to make headlines as a prospective candidate for that office. In a FDU PublicMind Poll released September 27, 2011, voters were asked "If you could pick a Democrat to run against Chris Christie for governor, who would you prefer?" Richard Codey came up as the most adequate candidate at 18% among other well-known Democrats like Cory Booker and Frank Pallone.

Potential gubernatorial candidacy in 2009 
The Obama administration approached Codey in 2009 to consider running for governor in Corzine's place if the incumbent withdrew from his reelection bid, citing polls showing that Codey led Republican Chris Christie. Corzine remained in the race and lost to Christie.

Electoral history

New Jersey Senate

New Jersey Assembly

References

External links
Richard Codey's 2011 Campaign web page
New Jersey legislative web page, New Jersey Legislature
New Jersey Legislature financial disclosure forms
2016 2015 2014 2013 2012 2011 2010 2009 2008 2007 2006 2005 2004
New Jersey Governor Richard J. Codey, National Governors Association
New Jersey Senate Democrats Website Biography
New Jersey Voter Information Website 2003
 

|-

|-

|-

|-

|-

|-

1946 births
Democratic Party governors of New Jersey
American funeral directors
Living people
Democratic Party members of the New Jersey General Assembly
Democratic Party New Jersey state senators
Orange High School (New Jersey) alumni
People from Orange, New Jersey
People from Roseland, New Jersey
People from West Orange, New Jersey
Presidents of the New Jersey Senate
21st-century American politicians
Catholics from New Jersey